Doksan Fortress (Hangul: 독산성, Hanja: 禿山城) is a Korean hill fort located in Osan, South Korea. It is known for the Siege of Doksan in 1593, where the Japanese failed to defeat Gwon Yul during the Imjin War. Located within the fort are the Bujek Buddhist Temple and the Semadae, a monument to Gwon Yul's victory. The site is designated as a Historic Site of South Korea. The annual Doksanseong Culture and Art Festival takes place near the fort each September.

References

Baekje
Castles in Korea
Joseon dynasty
Historic Sites of South Korea